Cychrus aeneus is a species of ground beetle in the subfamily of Carabinae. It was described by Fisher-Waldheim in 1824. It is found in the Caucasus region, on the border of Europe and Asia.

References

aeneus
Beetles described in 1824